Gabriel Varga (born May 16, 1985) is a Canadian kickboxer who competes in the Lightweight division of Karate Combat. He is the former Bellator KB Featherweight champion, the former two time Glory Featherweight champion and the former WKN lightweight champion.

A martial artist since his childhood, Varga started out in Shotokan karate and made the switch to kickboxing at seventeen. After becoming a Canadian, North American and two-time world champion during his amateur career, he turned professional in 2009 and won two more world championships in the pro ranks inside the space of seven months during 2011. Varga has since competed in the K-1, Glory, and Bellator Kickboxing promotions. In 2018 Gabriel started to upload videos to his YouTube channel.

Early life
Gabriel Varga was born in Toronto, Ontario and spent part of his childhood in Australia and New Zealand before settling in Victoria, British Columbia in 1999. He was introduced to martial arts at an early age by his father, Keith, a boxer and karateka. Also a classically trained pianist, Varga formally began training in Shotokan at the age of eight and eventually earned the rank of fourth degree black belt. He made the switch to kickboxing and Muay Thai, along with his brothers Aaron and Jacob, at seventeen years old.

Kickboxing career

Amateur career
Varga began competing as an amateur in 2006 at the age of twenty and, after amassing an 8–0 record by 2008, spent three months training in Thailand at Eminent Air, Fairtex, Por Pramuk and Sinbi Muay Thai.

Upon his return to Canada, he was given the chance to fight for his first title and he outpointed Carlos Garcia to take the ISKA Amateur North American Light Welterweight (-64.5 kg/142.2 lb) Oriental Championship. He then stopped Chuck Mady with body shots in the first round for the ISKA Amateur Canadian Super Lightweight (-62.3 kg/137.2 lb) Oriental title on August 15, 2008.

Now a national and continental belt holder, Varga faced Joe Concha in an ISKA super lightweight amateur world title match in his hometown of Victoria on January 24, 2009. He scored a knockdown in the fifth and final round and won by decision. He made the first defence of this title against Emil Salva on April 4, 2009, in Langford, British Columbia. After being dropped with a right overhand late in round one, Varga was able to rally back to win by a third round technical knockout that sent the Romanian through the ropes at the end of round three. On June 12, 2009, he made his final title defence with a wide points victory over Matt Embree in Victoria, British Columbia.

Following this, Varga moved back up in weight to challenge for the ISKA amateur light welterweight world title against Devon Henry in Victoria on July 20, 2009. He won by split decision after a back-and-forth fight. In his final bout as an amateur, he took a unanimous decision over Nathan Smandych on October 3, 2009, in Victoria to defend his ISKA light welterweight strap and bring his record to 15–0.

Professional career

WKN and WKF titles
Having fought mostly under Oriental rules during his amateur career, Varga ventured into the Muay Thai ruleset after turning professional and spent the early part of his career fighting abroad. In his pro debut on December 12, 2009, he travelled to Flushing, New York, United States and defeated local fighter Omar Ahmed by unanimous decision. He followed this up with another unanimous decision win over Justin Greskiewicz on February 19, 2010 before being invited to compete in an eight-man tournament held in New York on July 17, 2010. Despite entering as the tournament favourite, he was eliminated at the quarter-final stage when he lost to Terrence Hill via a controversial unanimous decision. The Varga camp attempted to have the result overturned and filed a complaint with the WKA a week later. Their bid was rejected, however, as it had been submitted too late. A rematch with Greskiewicz was set for December 3, 2010 at The Warriors Cup XIII in Lincroft, New Jersey, US but fell through when Justin was injured in a motorcycle accident. He was nominated for the 2010 "North American Fighter of the Year" award by Muay Thai Authority but lost out to Kevin Ross.

He returned to the ring on January 8, 2011, at a Canada vs. China event in Jinan, China where he won by unanimous decision under sanshou rules. With this, he earned himself a shot at the World Kickboxing Network (WKN) World Lightweight (-64.4 kg/142 lb) Oriental Championship. Fighting in Victoria for the first time as a professional on March 12, 2011, he heavily utilized knees and sweeps over five rounds to take the unanimous decision and come away with the belt. His rematch with Justin Greskiwicz was rescheduled for Battle at Bally's 2 in Atlantic City, New Jersey, US on August 11, 2011, but fell through again. Instead he took a second consecutive title match in which Varga knocked out Roy Tan in the third round to take the World Kickboxing Federation (WKF) World Light Welterweight (-64.5 kg/142 lb) K-1 belt in Vienna, Austria on September 24, 2011.

Glory Kickboxing
After a year out of the ring, he signed with K-1 and made his promotional debut at the K-1 World Grand Prix 2012 in Los Angeles in California on September 8, 2012, against Lerdsila Chumpairtour. Varga dropped the three-time Rajadamnern Stadium champion with a spinning backfist in the opening round but it was ruled a slip by the referee. Nonetheless, he kept a high tempo and fought aggressively en route to winning by unanimous decision.

He was recruited into Glory's 65 kg/143 lb class in 2013 and was amongst the division's eight elite fighters at the Glory 8: Tokyo - 2013 65kg Slam tournament in Tokyo, Japan on May 3, 2013. He dominated Abdellah Ezbiri en route to a unanimous decision win in the quarter-finals, but lost to the eventual champion Yuta Kubo by the same margin in the semis.

Varga was set to face Shane Oblonsky at Glory 11: Chicago - Heavyweight World Championship Tournament in Hoffman Estates, Illinois, US on October 12, 2013. However, Oblonsky withdrew due to injury and was replaced by Jose Palacios. Varga defeated Palacios via unanimous decision.

He was then set to make a defence of his WKN title for the first time against Jessy Petit-Jean in Belgium on November 9, 2013 but the bout was cancelled for undisclosed reasons.

Varga won the 2014 Glory Featherweight Contendership Tournament at Glory 17: Los Angeles in Inglewood, California, US on June 21, 2014, defeating Yodkhunpon Sitmonchai in the semi-finals and Shane Oblonsky in the final, both via unanimous decision.

On April 3, 2015, Varga defeated #1 ranked Mosab Amrani to become the inaugural GLORY Featherweight World Champion.  The title fight took place on Glory 20 in Dubai.  The decision win was unanimous with the 3 judges scoring 50–46, 48–47, and 49–46. He was scheduled to make his first title defense against Serhiy Adamchuk at Glory 25: Milan. Adamchuk won the fight by unanimous decision, handing Varga his first loss in over two years.

Two months later, Varga fought Liu Wei at the Hero Legends event in Hainan, China, for the Hero Legends Featherweight title. Varga won the fight by unanimous decision. He then challenged for the Glory featherweight title, in a rematch with Serhiy Adamchuk. Varga won the fight by majority decision. He was scheduled to defend his title three months later, at Glory 34: Denver, against Robin van Roosmalen. van Roosmalen won the fight by fourth-round TKO.

Bellator Kickboxing
Varga subsequently left Glory, and signed with Bellator Kickboxing. He made his promotional debut at Bellator Kickboxing 6: Budapest against Gabor Gorbics, losing the fight by split decision. Varga would rebound from this loss with a decision win against Lu Yichen at Hero Legends and a second-round TKO of Roberto Gheorghita at Bellator Kickboxing 8: Florence. Two months later, Varga fought Tie Yinghua, losing by unanimous decision.

On July 14, 2018, in Rome, Italy Varga won his 6th professional world title.  He defeated Kevin Ross by 1st-round TKO to win the Bellator Kickboxing Featherweight World Title. He defended his title against Shan Cangelosi at Bellator Kickboxing 11. He defeated Cangelosi by knockout in the first round. Varga defended his title for the second time against Cristian Faustino at Bellator Kickboxing 12, winning by unanimous decision.

On March 19, 2021, Varga was released by Bellator as he had fulfilled his contract and Bellator would no longer be featuring Kickboxing events. Varga still held the Bellator World Kickboxing title.

Karate Combat 
On December 22, 2021, it was announced that Varga had signed an exclusive contract with Karate Combat and will debut in the Lightweight division in the 2022 season.

Mixed martial arts career 
In 2019, Varga made the transition to mixed martial arts competition for Bellator. He made his debut against Jamese Taylor at Bellator 224 on July 12, 2019. He won the fight via TKO in the second round.

He made his sophomore appearance against Teejay Britton on February 21, 2020, at Bellator 239. He lost the bout via split decision.

Championships and awards

Kickboxing
Bellator Kickboxing
Bellator Kickboxing Featherweight (-65 kg/143.3 lb) Champion
Hero Legends
Hero Legends 2016 Featherweight (-65 kg/143.3 lb) Champion
Glory
Glory Featherweight Champion (two times; first)
2015, 2016 Glory Featherweight (-65 kg/143.3 lb) Champion
2014 Glory Featherweight (-65 kg/143.3 lb) Contender Tournament Winner
International Sport Karate Association
ISKA Amateur Canadian Super Lightweight (-62.3 kg/137.2 lb) Oriental Championship
ISKA Amateur North American Light Welterweight (-64.5 kg/142.2 lb) Oriental Championship
ISKA Amateur World Super Lightweight (-62.3 kg/137.2 lb) Oriental Championship
ISKA Amateur World Light Welterweight (-64.5 kg/142.2 lb) Oriental Championship
World Kickboxing Association
WKA Amateur British Columbia Light Welterweight (-64 kg/141.1 lb) Championship
World Kickboxing Federation
WKF World Light Welterweight (-64.5 kg/142 lb) K-1 Championship
World Kickboxing Network
WKN World Lightweight (-64.4 kg/142 lb) Oriental Championship

Kickboxing record

|- style="background:#cfc;"
| 2019-10-12|| Win ||align=left| Cristian Faustino|| Bellator Kickboxing 12|| Milan, Italy || Decision (Unanimous) || 5 || 3:00|| 18-6
|-
! style=background:white colspan=9 |
|- style="background:#cfc;"
| 2018-12-01|| Win ||align=left| Shan Cangelosi|| Bellator Kickboxing 11|| Genoa, Italy || KO (Punch) || 1 || 2:42|| 17-6
|-
! style=background:white colspan=9 |
|- style="background:#cfc;"
| 2018-07-14|| Win ||align=left| Kevin Ross|| Bellator Kickboxing 10 : Rome|| Rome, Italy || TKO (Ref. Stoppage/Punches) || 1 || 2:08|| 16-6
|-
! style=background:white colspan=9 |
|- style="background:#fbb;"
| 2018-02-03 || Loss ||align=left| Tie Yinghua || Glory of Heroes: Chengdu|| Chengdu, China || Decision (Unanimous) || 3 || 3:00 || 15-6
|- style="background:#cfc;"
| 2017-12-09|| Win ||align=left| Roberto Gheorghiță || Bellator Kickboxing 8: Florence|| Florence, Italy || TKO (Ref. Stoppage) || 2 || 2:49 || 15-5
|-
|- style="background:#cfc;"
| 2017-06-25 || Win ||align=left| Lu Yichen || Hero Legends|| Shenzhen, China || Decision (unanimous) || 3 || 3:00 || 14-5
|- style="background:#fbb;"
| 2017-04-14 || Loss ||align=left| Gábor Görbics || Bellator Kickboxing 6: Budapest|| Budapest, Hungary || Decision (Split) || 3 || 3:00 || 13-5
|- style="background:#fbb;"
| 2016-10-21 || Loss ||align=left| Robin van Roosmalen || Glory 34: Denver || Broomfield, Colorado || TKO (corner stoppage) || 4 || 3:00 || 13-4
|-
! style=background:white colspan=9 |
|- style="background:#cfc;"
| 2016-07-22 || Win ||align=left| Serhiy Adamchuk || Glory 32: Virginia || Norfolk, Virginia || Decision (majority) || 5 || 3:00 || 13-3
|-
! style=background:white colspan=9 |
|- style="background:#cfc;"
| 2016-01-16 || Win ||align=left| Liu Wei || Hero Legends || Hainan, China || Decision(unanimous) || 3 || 3:00 || 12-3
|-
! style=background:white colspan=9 |
|- style="background:#fbb;"
| 2015-11-06 || Loss ||align=left| Serhiy Adamchuk || Glory 25: Milan || Monza, Italy || Decision (Unanimous) || 5 || 3:00 || 11-3
|-
! style=background:white colspan=9 |
|- style="background:#cfc;"
| 2015-04-03 || Win ||align=left| Mosab Amrani || Glory 20: Dubai || Dubai, UAE || Decision (unanimous) || 5 || 3:00 || 11-2
|-
! style=background:white colspan=9 |
|- style="background:#cfc;"
| 2014-06-21 || Win ||align=left| Shane Oblonsky || Glory 17: Los Angeles - Featherweight Contender Tournament, Final || Inglewood, California, US || Decision (unanimous) || 3 || 3:00 || 10-2
|-
! style=background:white colspan=9 |
|- style="background:#cfc;"
| 2014-06-21 || Win ||align=left| Yodkhunpon Sitmonchai || Glory 17: Los Angeles - Featherweight Contender Tournament, Semi Finals || Inglewood, California, US || Decision (unanimous) || 3 || 3:00 || 9-2
|- style="background:#cfc;"
| 2013-10-12 || Win ||align=left| Jose Palacios || Glory 11: Chicago || Hoffman Estates, Illinois, US || Decision (unanimous) || 3 || 3:00 || 8-2
|- style="background:#fbb;"
| 2013-05-03 || Loss ||align=left| Yuta Kubo || Glory 8: Tokyo - 65 kg Slam Tournament, Semi Finals || Tokyo, Japan || Decision (unanimous) || 3 || 3:00 || 7-2
|- style="background:#cfc;"
| 2013-05-03 || Win ||align=left| Abdellah Ezbiri || Glory 8: Tokyo - 65 kg Slam Tournament, Quarter Finals || Tokyo, Japan || Decision (unanimous) || 3 || 3:00 || 7-1
|- style="background:#cfc;"
| 2012-09-08 || Win ||align=left| Lerdsila Chumpairtour || K-1 World Grand Prix 2012 in Los Angeles || Los Angeles, California, US || Decision (unanimous) || 3 || 3:00 || 6-1
|- style="background:#cfc;"
| 2011-09-24 || Win ||align=left| Roy Tan || Fight for a Dream || Vienna, Austria || KO || 3 || || 5-1
|-
! style=background:white colspan=9 |
|- style="background:#cfc;"
| 2011-03-12 || Win ||align=left| Yohan Ha Van || Quest for the Title || Victoria, British Columbia, Canada || Decision (unanimous) || 5 || 3:00 || 4-1
|-
! style=background:white colspan=9 |
|- style="background:#cfc;"
| 2011-01-08 || Win ||align=left| Xiao Jie || Canada vs. China || Jinan, China || Decision (unanimous) || 5 || 3:00 || 3-1
|- style="background:#fbb;"
| 2010-07-17 || Loss ||align=left| Terrence Hill || Take-On Productions, Quarter Finals || New York City, New York, US || Decision (unanimous) || 3 || 3:00 || 2-1
|- style="background:#cfc;"
| 2010-02-19 || Win ||align=left| Justin Greskiewicz || Friday Night Fights || New York City, New York, US || Decision (unanimous) || 5 || 3:00 || 2-0
|- style="background:#cfc;"
| 2009-12-12 || Win ||align=left| Omar Ahmed || The New York Showdown II || New York City, New York, US || Decision (unanimous) || 5 || 3:00 || 1-0
|-
| colspan=9 | Legend:

Amateur kickboxing record

|- style="background:#cfc;"
| 2009-10-03 || Win ||align=left| Nathan Smandych || Quest for the Title IV || Victoria, British Columbia, Canada || Decision (unanimous) || 5 || 2:00
|-
! style=background:white colspan=9 |
|- style="background:#cfc;"
| 2009-07-20 || Win ||align=left| Devon Henry || Quest for the Title III || Victoria, British Columbia, Canada || Decision (split) || 5 || 2:00
|-
! style=background:white colspan=9 |
|- style="background:#cfc;"
| 2009-06-12 || Win ||align=left| Matt Embree || Summer Slugfest III || Vancouver, British Columbia, Canada || Decision || 5 || 2:00
|-
! style=background:white colspan=9 |
|- style="background:#cfc;"
| 2009-04-04 || Win ||align=left| Emil Salva || Quest for the Title II || Langford, British Columbia, Canada || TKO (punches) || 3 || 2:00
|-
! style=background:white colspan=9 |
|- style="background:#cfc;"
| 2009-01-24 || Win ||align=left| Joe Concha || Quest for the Title I || Victoria, British Columbia, Canada || Decision || 5 || 2:00
|-
! style=background:white colspan=9 |
|- style="background:#cfc;"
| 2008-08-15 || Win ||align=left| Chuck Mady || Summer Slugfest || Victoria, British Columbia, Canada || KO (body punches) || 1 || 
|-
! style=background:white colspan=9 |
|- style="background:#cfc;"
| 2008-00-00 || Win ||align=left| Carlos Garcia || || || Decision || 4 || 2:00
|-
! style=background:white colspan=9 |
|- style="background:#cfc;"
| 2006-04-15 || Win ||align=left| Ronnie Alampour || Battle at the Bear || Victoria, British Columbia, Canada || KO (punches) || 1 || 
|-
| colspan=9 | Legend:

Mixed martial arts record

|-
|Loss
|align=center|1–1
|Teejay Britton 
|Decision (split)
|Bellator 239
|
|align=center|3
|align=center|5:00
|Thackerville, Oklahoma, United States
|
|-
|Win
|align=center|1–0
|Jamese Taylor
|TKO (punches)
|Bellator 224
|
|align=center|2
|align=center|3:23
|Thackerville, Oklahoma, United States
|

See also
 List of male kickboxers

References

External links
 Official site

1985 births
Living people
Canadian male kickboxers
Lightweight kickboxers
Welterweight kickboxers
Canadian male karateka
Shotokan practitioners
Canadian people of Hungarian descent
Canadian people of German descent
Sportspeople from Toronto
Sportspeople from Victoria, British Columbia
Glory kickboxers
Canadian male mixed martial artists